is a 2021 Japanese fantasy adventure film directed by Takashi Miike. A sequel to The Great Yokai War, the film was released in Japan on August 13, 2021 by Toho and Kadokawa. Among the film's cast of creatures is the title character from the 1966 Daiei film series Daimajin.

The film premiered in Japan on August 13 and internationally at the online event Fantasia International Film Festival on August 25, 2021.

Plot

Cast
 Kokoro Terada as Kei Watanabe
 Hana Sugisaki as Fox-Faced Woman
Rei Inomata as Dai Watanabe
 Takao Osawa as Inugami Gyōbu
 Nao Ōmori as Nao Omori
 Sakura Ando as Ubume
 Yuko Oshima as Yukionna
 Eiji Akaso as Amanojaku
 Takahiro Miura as Tengu
 Renji Ishibashi as Ōkubi
 Kenichi Endō as Yadokai
 Hiroshi Aramata as Amefurikozō
 SUMIRE as Ibarakidoji
 Takashi Okamura as Azukiarai
 Koji Okura as Shojo
 Hikakin as Yokai Hikakin
 Ryūnosuke Kamiki as Professor Katō
 Kei's Homeroom teacher, he is actually Yasunori Kato, the villain from the previous film. Kamiki, who plays him, had played the main character Inao Tadashi in the previous film, The Great Yokai War 2005.
 Akira Emoto as Old Man
 Kazuki Kitamura as Tsuna Watanabe
 Nanako Matsushima as Reika Watanabe
 Myra Arai as Rokurokubi

Production
Production credits

Featured yōkai

Yokaiju
Daimajin
Fox-Faced Woman
Inugami Gyōbu
Nurarihyon
Ubume
Shōjō
Tengu
Yuki-onna
Amanojaku
Ibarakidoji
Azukiarai
Yadokai
Okubi
Amefurikozo
Kappa
Karakasakozo
Rokurokubi
Yokai Hikakin
Ittan-momen
Bake-Danuki
Ushi-oni motorcycle
Dracula
Frankenstein
Yeti
Xingtian
Medusa
Cyclops
Zombie
Witch
Troll
Fish-man
Egyptian mummy
Killer clown

Release
The film's U.S. premiere took place on August 28, 2021, as part of the Japan Cuts film festival held by the Japan Society in New York City.

Manga adaptation
On December 26, 2020 a manga adaptation of the film began being serialized by Kadokawa in Monthly Shōnen Ace.

See also
List of Japanese films of 2021
List of fantasy films of the 2020s
List of monster movies

References

External links
Official website

Toho webpage 
Kadokawa webpage

2020s Japanese films
2020s children's fantasy films
2020s fantasy adventure films
2021 fantasy films
2021 films
Crossover tokusatsu films
Films based on Japanese myths and legends
Films directed by Takashi Miike
Giant monster films
Japanese sequel films
2020s Japanese-language films
Kadokawa Daiei Studio films
Kaiju films
OLM, Inc. films
Reboot films
Toho films
War adventure films
Works about yōkai
Yōkai in popular culture